Matilde Kondrup Nielsen (born 9 February 1995) is a Danish handball player for Ajax København in the Danish Women's Handball League.

References 

Danish female handball players
1995 births
Living people
People from Vesthimmerland Municipality
Sportspeople from the North Jutland Region